Bulkworthy is a village and civil parish in the Torridge district of Devon, England, about 9 miles southwest of Great Torrington, and on the River Torridge.  According to the 2001 census it had a population of 83. It is listed in the Domesday Book as Buchesworde.

References

External links

Villages in Devon
Torridge District